The Naghsh-e-Jahan Derby, also known as the Isfahan Derby, is a football match between Sepahan and Zob Ahan, the two biggest teams of the city of Isfahan, Iran.
 
According to journalist Afshin Afshar, the competition is one of the most popular annual football events in Iran.

History
The first match between Sepahan and Zob Ahan was played in the 1972 Jam-e-Enghelab football tournament, held in Isfahan. Sepahan won 5–4 in a thrilling penalty shoot-out after 120 minutes of play. Sepahan's goals were scored by Masoud Tabesh, Rasoul Khorosh, Hajrasouli, Chalangar and Yazdkhasti, while Zob Ahan's fifth penalty by Yazdanpanah was saved by Mohammad Borzmehri, who was known as the "Iranian Yashin". The two clubs then played each other annually in the Takht Jamshid Cup (1974/75, 1975/76, 1976/77 and 1977/78). The rivalry resumed in the 1990s when they faced each other in the Azadegan League (1993/94, 1996/97, 1997/98) and from then on, they met each other twice a year.

All-time record

All results 
This list is incomplete; you can help by expanding it.

Summary of results

Total matches

Trophies

Top goal scorers

1 Khatibi scored 3 goals as the Sepahan player and 1 goal as the Zob Ahan player.
2 Khalatbari scored 2 goals as the Zob Ahan player and 2 goals as the Sepahan player.

Notable Derby Players

See also
 Football in Iran
 Tehran Derby
 El Gilano
 Mashhad Derby
 Persepolis F.C.–Sepahan S.C. rivalry
 Esteghlal F.C.–Sepahan S.C. rivalry
 Persepolis F.C.–Tractor S.C. rivalry
 Esteghlal F.C.–Tractor S.C rivalry
 Major football rivalries

References

External links
 Persianleague.com
leagueproiran.com
leagueiran.com

Sport in Isfahan
Football derbies in Iran
Sepahan S.C. matches